George A. Sunga is an American director and producer. He is notable for producing the American sitcom television series Three's Company (and its spin-offs The Ropers and Three's a Crowd).

Sunga was raised in San Diego, California, where he attended San Diego State University. He began his career in 1963, as a production supervisor for the short-lived musical variety television series The Judy Garland Show. 

Sunga later produced and directed other television programs including All in the Family, The Jeffersons, The Redd Foxx Show, Good Times, The Smothers Brothers Comedy Hour, Dear John, The Good Life, Gung Ho, Someone Like Me and Perfect Station. In 1969, Sunga was nominated for a Primetime Emmy for Outstanding Variety or Musical Series.

In 1972 Sunga was an associate producer of the television film Of Thee I Sing. He retired in 2006, last directing and producing for the television film, John Ritter: Working with a Master.

References

External links 

Living people
Year of birth missing (living people)
San Diego State University alumni
American producers
American television producers
American film producers
American directors
American television directors